The Minister of State is an honorary title in the Netherlands. The title is formally granted together with the style Excellency, by the Monarch, but on the initiative of the cabinet of the Netherlands. It is given on a personal basis, for life rather than for a specified period. The title is granted for exceptional merits, generally to senior politicians at the end of their party career. Ministers of state are often former cabinet members or party leaders. Ministers of State advise the Sovereign in delicate situations, with moral authority but without formal competence. A Minister of State is not part of a cabinet, but may be asked to represent the government for certain events. The Ministers of State have a diplomatic passport. Before World War II it was common for Ministers of State to still have a public function, some notable as Pieter Cort van der Linden and Hendrikus Colijn, were Minister of State while they served as Prime Minister of the Netherlands. After World War II, Louis Beel was the only person who still sat in the cabinet while he was Minister of State.

Current Ministers of State

Historical Ministers of State

External links
  Ministers van Staat Rijksoverheid